Haweis is a surname. Notable people with the surname include:

 Hugh Reginald Haweis (1838–1901), English cleric and writer
 Mary Eliza Haweis (1848–1898), English author and painter, wife of Hugh
 Thomas Haweis ( 1734–1820), English cleric